Frederick C. "Tricky" Nichols (July 26, 1850 – August 22, 1897) was a pitcher in Major League Baseball for six seasons from 1875 to 1882. He played for six teams: New Haven Elm Citys in 1875, Boston Red Caps in 1876, St. Louis Brown Stockings in 1877, Providence Grays in 1878, Worcester Ruby Legs in 1880, and Baltimore Orioles in 1882.  He died in his hometown of Bridgeport, Connecticut at the age of 47, and is interred at Lakeview Cemetery.

References

External links

1850 births
1897 deaths
Sportspeople from Bridgeport, Connecticut
Baseball players from Connecticut
Major League Baseball pitchers
19th-century baseball players
New Haven Elm Citys players
Boston Red Caps players
St. Louis Brown Stockings players
Providence Grays players
Worcester Ruby Legs players
Baltimore Orioles (NL) players
Worcester Grays players
Albany (minor league baseball) players
East Saginaw Grays players
Minneapolis Millers (baseball) players
Washington Nationals (minor league) players
New Britain (minor league baseball) players
Bridgeport Giants players
Brockton (minor league baseball) players
Denver (minor league baseball) players
Savannah (minor league baseball) players
Houston Babies players
Houston Red Stockings players